is a genre of  produced during the middle of the Edo period (1603–1867), from 1775 to the early 19th century. Physically identifiable by their yellow-backed covers,  were typically printed in 10 page volumes, many spanning two to three volumes in length, with the average number of total pages being 30. Considered to be the first purely adult comicbook in Japanese literature, a large picture spanned each page, with descriptive prose and dialogue filling the blank spaces in the image.

Due to the numerous characters and letters in the Japanese language, moveable type took longer to catch on in Japan; it was easier to carve the text directly onto the same wood block as the illustration. This allowed for a close and harmonious interaction between image and text, with either a balance of both elements, or text dominating the image.  used kana-based vernacular language. Known for its satirical view of and commentary on flaws in contemporary society, these books focused primarily on urban culture, with most early works writing about the pleasure quarters. Typically,  were printed with 10 pages in a volume, with the average number of total pages being 30, thus spanning several volumes.

While  may have only been popular for a short period of time, thousands of pieces were published. At its peak in 1784, a record of 92 titles were published. Only a fraction of this genre has been studied, leaving much to still be written.

History
Uda Toshihiko divides the history of  into five periods: the incipient pieces (1775–1779), early works (1780–1783), gossip pieces (1784–1787), protest pieces (1788–1790), and post-Kansei Reform works.

Incipient works
The piece featured realistic dialogue, trendy language, contemporary slang, and modern fashion trends.
Through Master Flashgold, Harumachi created not only a new genre but a new market entirely; 50 to 60  titles are estimated to have been published in the next 2 to 3 years alone. Initially, print runs were limited, but the high demands lead to the number of copies per run, as well as the number of titles per year, to increase.

Early works
Continuing his success, Harumachi released many more successful . Other authors were keen to follow his lead, including Santō Kyōden, Shiba Zenkō, Ōta Nanpo, and Hōseidō Kisanji, all of whom got their start during this period. Kisanji's  threw him into the popular literature spotlight when published in 1781.

Golden age of gossip pieces
 published during this time were riddled with countless references to contemporary persons, places and events. The pieces from this period were composed of nine parts social satire and one part political satire. Kyōden's , for example, alludes to modern kabuki actors, authors, poets, and courtesans. It contains political overtones regarding the class system, as the protagonist Enjirō tries desperately to live the life of the romantic heroes of kabuki plays and ballads, despite being a merchant's son; he is firmly put back in his place at the end of the story.

Other popular titles of the day include:
 by  Ōta Nanpo (1784)
 by Kyōden (1785)
 by Ōta Nanpo (1786)

Political satire of "protest pieces"
Piece from this era reversed the proportion of the gossip pieces to nine parts political, one part social. These  were written during an intense period of social unrest; Japan was afflicted with natural catastrophes, such as floods, volcanoes, cold weather, earthquakes, and draught, leading to high commodity prices as famine struck the country, causing an estimated one million citizens to starve to death. Additionally, government corruption, fiscal mismanagement, and the threat of class wars were plaguing the nation. These protest  reflected the popular sentiments, but these messages were never outright stated, in order to get past censors. Instead, the authors used a number of literary devices, such as allegory, asides, and reductio ad absurdum to code their true messages. The key to the satire of this period was overtone rather than overt statements. Popular subjects to satirize included the Tokugawa regime, bad blood between Tanuma Okitsugu and Sono Zanzaemon Masakoto, devaluation of the silver coin, and Neo-Confucian policies advocated during the Kansei Reforms, based on a sampling of major works. While never proven, it is likely that these novels contributed to public outrage and violence.

Famous satirical pieces
 by Zenkō (1785), satirizing the devaluation of the silver coin
 by Kyōden (1786), satirizing Neo-Confucian policies
 by Kyōden (1788), satirizing political rivalry between Tanuma Okitsugu and Sano Masakoto
 by Kyōden (1788), which mocked the government's inability to provide food for its people
 by Kisanji (1788), satirizing the Neo-Confucian ideal that samurai must master both literary and martial arts
 by Kyōden (1788), satirizing Neo-Confucian ideals of usefulness
 by Harumachi (1789), satirizing the dual mastery of literary and martial arts for samurai

Post-Kansei Reforms works
All printed material had to be approved by government appointed censors; printblocks had to be submitted to a censor and had to be stamped "inspected" before the piece could go to print. Additionally, all publications had to clearly state the names of the author, artist, and publisher, to prevent unapproved material from being produced.

The government also reprimanded authors of the protest pieces, and by 1791 virtually no one had gotten by unscathed. The first to be punished was Hōseidō Kisanji. It is said he was ordered to disappear from Edo, by means of a forced exile. Koikawa Harumachi was summoned, but he declined to appear on medical grounds. He ultimately avoided having to present himself by dying abruptly; rumors of a self-imposed death spread. Ōta Nanpo unexpectedly gave up writing and disappeared under the radar. Publisher Tsutaya Jūzaburō had half of his assets confiscated; he was arguably the most influential publisher of popular literature and art of his time.

Kyōden, undisputedly, was reprimanded most severely. He was brought before the City Magistrate and was forced to recant. He was then shackled and put under house arrest for 50 days. Despite the punishment, he continued to publish  for 15 years, but no longer with political overtones. He also released what is considered one of the last masterpieces of the genre, in 1791. It was written and published after the admonishments of Kisanji, Nanpo, and Harumachi, but before he himself was prosecuted.

The last major author to be punished was Shikitei Sanba. His piece , published in 1799, actually incited physical violence. An Edo fire brigade assailed his residence, as well as the residence of his publisher, ironically enough in protest of the negative portrayal of fire brigades in his story.

Due to censorship, works after 1791 lacked the playful spark of earlier . Without political and social satire as fodder, authors were forced to go back to parodying earlier  and other written formats, which grew tedious fast.

Decline
Many scholars agree that the end of the genre came in 1806, though individual pieces continued to trickle out until as late as 1828. The likely cause of the death of the genre was instead the constant attempts by authors to broaden the reader base by appealing to a wider audience.

Initially,  were written by educated authors for educated individuals. As authors attempted to expand the reader base across different classes and education levels, the jokes, allusions, and humour were inevitably dumbed down. As author Adam L. Kern notes, "in bending over backwards to expand its readership, the  lost its esoteric uniqueness. In this sense,  fell victim to its own success."

Translating 
One is the method used by James T. Araki in the 1970s, described as an illustrated playscript. While not perfect, many translators followed his example and used this format. Thus, this format gives the misconception that the manner in which  can be read is straightforward. It also creates a disconnect between the text and images by taking the text out of the image, making it seems as if the parts are independent of one another, when they in fact are interrelated and inseparable.

Another common method of translation is to replace the original, handwritten text. In the 1920s, Yamaguchi Takeshi replaced the penned text with typescript, but it did not adequately convey the flowing nature of the original script. Sugiura Hinako improved upon this concept when publishing her rendition of Master Flashgold, by replacing the sprawling script with her own less curvaceous, more legible handwriting.

Similar genres
 had its roots in earlier illustrated novels, starting with the companion novels. These lightly illustrated novels would slowly evolve into , or "red books", the oldest form of woodblock printed comic books.  tended to be easy-to-read adaptations of children's stories, folk legends, and fairy tales. Thus, the next type of woodblock comics, or "black books", feature more complicated retellings of kabuki and puppet plays, heroic legends and military accounts, while still being easy to read. This last genre is from which  would directly descend.

Popular authors
 Koikawa Harumachi
 Hōseidō Kisanji
 Kyōden
 Ōta Nanpo

See also
 
 
 Manga

Notes

References

Edo-period works
Gesaku
Japanese art
Japanese literature
Japanese words and phrases